Ocnogyna pudens is a moth of the family Erebidae. It was described by Hippolyte Lucas in 1853. It is found in North Africa.

Subspecies
Ocnogyna pudens pudens
Ocnogyna pudens leprieuri (Oberthür, 1878)

References

Spilosomina
Moths described in 1853